Pulsatilla bungeana is a species of flowering plant belonging to the family Ranunculaceae.

It is native to Southern Siberia to Mongolia.

References

bungeana